Small Engine Repair is a 2021 American black comedy drama film written and directed by John Pollono based on Pollono's play of the same name.

Plot
The seemingly casual reunion of three old friends at an out-of-the-way repair shop masks a hidden agenda fueled by the arrival of a privileged young yuppie.

Cast
 Jon Bernthal as Terrance Swaino
Hunter Jones as Young Terrance Swaino
 John Pollono as Frank Romanowski
Zachary Hernandez as Young Frank Romanowski
 Shea Whigham as Packie Hanrahan
 Spencer House as Chad Walker
 Jordana Spiro as Karen Delgado
 Ciara Bravo as Crystal Romanowski
Nina Peterson as Young Crystal Romanowski
Addie Bernthal as 4-Year-Old Crystal Romanowski
 Josh Helman as Anthony Romanowski
 Michael Redfield as Tommy Hanrahan
 Ashlie Atkinson as Diane Swaino
 Jenna Lamia as Patty Swaino
 Joshua Bitton as Lawrence Swaino
 Shannon Esper as Judy Swaino
 John Rothman as Mr. Walker
 Ajna Jai as Afnahn
 Tom Draper as Mikey, The Bartender
 Jennifer Pollono as Dottie
 James Badge Dale as "Badge"
 James Ransone as P.J.

Production
First announced in January 2019, a film adaptation of the play Small Engine Repair was produced early that year. Production began in February 2019 outside of New York City, namely in Yonkers and Tappan, New York. Although, some establishing shots were taken in Manchester, New Hampshire, the city where the film takes place.

The film was penned and directed by John Pollono and produced by Peter Abrams, Jon Bernthal, Rick Rosenthal, and Noah Rothman. Pollono and Bernthal reprise their roles from the original production and Shea Whigham and Spencer House portray Packie and Chad, respectively. Michael Redfield and Josh Helman, who both starred in the original production, are in the film as new characters. Additionally, Jennifer Pollono, the original costume designer, and Sophie Pollono, her daughter with John Pollono, also have roles in the film.

Release
The adaptation was slated to premiere in March 2020 as part of the SXSW Festival's Narrative Spotlight. Following the cancellation of the festival that year, the premiere was put on hold. The film instead premiered on the 2020 SXSW Online Festival. Small Engine Repair was released in theaters by Vertical Entertainment on September 10, 2021.

Reception
On review aggregator Rotten Tomatoes, the film holds an 78% approval rating based on 49 reviews with an average rating of 7.2/10.

References

External links
 
2021 films
2021 black comedy films
2021 independent films
2020s English-language films
American black comedy films
American films based on plays
2021 comedy-drama films
American comedy-drama films
2020s American films
Films postponed due to the COVID-19 pandemic